Glasscock County is a county located in the U.S. state of Texas. As of the 2020 census, its population was 1,116. Its county seat is Garden City. The county was created in 1887 and later organized in 1893. It is named for George Washington Glasscock, an early settler of the Austin, Texas area and the namesake of Georgetown, Texas.

Glasscock County is included in the Big Spring, TX Micropolitan Statistical Area.

Geography
The Spraberry Trend, the third-largest oil field in the United States by remaining reserves, underlies much of the county.

Major highways
  U.S. Highway 87
  State Highway 137
  State Highway 158
  Ranch to Market Road 33

Adjacent counties
 Howard County (north)
 Sterling County (east)
 Reagan County (south)
 Upton County (southwest)
 Midland County (west)
 Martin County (northwest)

Demographics

Note: the US Census treats Hispanic/Latino as an ethnic category. This table excludes Latinos from the racial categories and assigns them to a separate category. Hispanics/Latinos can be of any race.

At the 2000 census there were 1,406 people, 483 households, and 355 families in the county.  The population density was 2 people per square mile (1/km²).  There were 660 housing units at an average density of 1 per square mile (0/km²).  The racial makeup of the county was 77.52% White, 0.50% Black or African American, 0.14% Native American, 0.21% Pacific Islander, 19.13% from other races, and 2.49% from two or more races.  29.87% of the population were Hispanic or Latino of any race.
Of the 483 households 42.00% had children under the age of 18 living with them, 67.50% were married couples living together, 2.90% had a female householder with no husband present, and 26.50% were non-families. 23.80% of households were one person and 7.00% were one person aged 65 or older.  The average household size was 2.91 and the average family size was 3.51.

The age distribution was 33.50% under the age of 18, 7.10% from 18 to 24, 28.40% from 25 to 44, 22.00% from 45 to 64, and 9.00% 65 or older.  The median age was 34 years. For every 100 females there were 108.90 males.  For every 100 females age 18 and over, there were 113.00 males.

The median household income was $35,655 and the median family income  was $43,000. Males had a median income of $27,000 versus $27,083 for females. The per capita income for the county was $18,279.  14.70% of the population and 11.50% of families were below the poverty line.  Out of the total people living in poverty, 17.50% are under the age of 18 and 4.10% are 65 or older.

Politics
Glasscock County is located in West Texas, one of the most strongly conservative areas of the nation. However, even by those standards, Glasscock County is heavily Republican. It has not supported a Democrat for president since 1960–the only time it has done so since 1948. In the last seven elections, fewer than 100 voters have supported a Democratic candidate, and in the last six elections, the Republican has carried over 90 percent of the county's vote.

In the 2000 U.S. Presidential election, Glasscock County was the most strongly Republican county in the United States, giving 93.1% of its votes to Republican candidate George W. Bush
.

This pro-Republican trend is reflected in party membership. During the 2008 Presidential primary in Texas, 19 voters from Glasscock County cast ballots in the Democratic race, while over 400 cast ballots in the Republican race.

Communities
 Garden City (county seat)
 St. Lawrence

See also

 National Register of Historic Places listings in Glasscock County, Texas
 Recorded Texas Historic Landmarks in Glasscock County

References

External links
 
 Inventory of county records, Glasscock County courthouse, Garden City, Texas, hosted by the Portal to Texas History
 "Glasscock County Profile" from the "Texas Association of Counties" 

 
1893 establishments in Texas
Populated places established in 1893